Jerry King is a cartoonist. He has received the National Cartoonists Society Magazine Gag Cartoon Award for 2001 and was nominated for their Gag Cartoon Award and Magazine Gag Cartoon Award for 2002.

Jerry King draws cartoons for Playboy Magazine and many other publications and websites worldwide.

External links
Online portfolio 

Living people
Playboy cartoonists
Year of birth missing (living people)
Place of birth missing (living people)